Dasia grisea, also known as the gray dasia, big tree skink, or gray tree skink, is a species of skink found in Malaysia, Singapore, Indonesia, and the Philippines.

References

grisea
Lizards of Asia
Reptiles of Indonesia
Reptiles of the Malay Peninsula
Reptiles of the Philippines
Reptiles of Singapore
Reptiles described in 1845
Taxa named by John Edward Gray
Reptiles of Borneo
Fauna of Sumatra